Deans Lake is a lake in Scott County, in the U.S. state of Minnesota.

Deans Lake was named for Matthew Dean, a pioneer who settled near the lake in the 1850s.

See also
List of lakes in Minnesota

References

Lakes of Minnesota
Lakes of Scott County, Minnesota